James Weimer House is a historic home located at St. Albans, Kanawha County, West Virginia.  It was built in 1917, and is a -story, brick dwelling with Classical Revival and Colonial Revival style detailing. It has a gambrel roof with original red clay tiles and dormers.  It features a one-story porch running the width of the house and continuing a short distance along the side.  Also on the property is a contributing brick garage.

It was listed on the National Register of Historic Places in 2004.

References

Neoclassical architecture in West Virginia
Colonial Revival architecture in West Virginia
Houses completed in 1917
Houses in Kanawha County, West Virginia
Houses on the National Register of Historic Places in West Virginia
National Register of Historic Places in Kanawha County, West Virginia
St. Albans, West Virginia